John White was a 15th-century Archdeacon in Ireland.

He was Archdeacon of Armagh from 1432 to 1449; and Archdeacon of Meath from 1450 to 1478.

Notes

Archdeacons of Armagh
15th-century Irish Roman Catholic priests